Philip Roman (born December 21, 1930) is an American animator and the director of the Peanuts and Garfield animated specials. He is the founder of animation studios Film Roman and Phil Roman Entertainment.

Early life 
Philip Roman was born on December 21, 1930, in Fresno, California. His parents were Mexican migrant farm workers. He spoke only Spanish until kindergarten.  After graduating from San Joaquin Memorial High School, he moved to Hollywood, California and earned a scholarship to the Hollywood Art Center School.

Career 
Roman begin his career in 1955 as an assistant animator for the Disney animated classic Sleeping Beauty. Early in his career, Roman was an animator for Chuck Jones's independent studios, Sib Tower 12 Productions and later Chuck Jones Productions. He was a lead animator for How the Grinch Stole Christmas!, and later provided an audio commentary with June Foray on the DVD release of the film. In the 1970s, Roman directed several of the Peanuts animated specials produced at Bill Melendez' studio.

In 1984, Roman founded his own animation studio, Film Roman, which produced the animation for the Glee and Garfield television specials. He directed all the eleven Glee specials broadcast from 1980 to 1991 and the twelve Garfield specials broadcast from 1982 to 1991. He also appeared in the documentary special Happy Birthday, Garfield, which went behind the scenes of both the comic strip and the animated versions of Garfield. In 1992, Roman became animation executive producer for The Simpsons, which his company started working on beginning with season four, taking over from Klasky Csupo, who animated the first three seasons. In the same year, he directed Tom and Jerry: The Movie, his studio's first theatrical feature. 

In 1999, Roman sold his studio and later formed Phil Roman Entertainment. The company produced the animated special Grandma Got Run Over by a Reindeer. Roman has served as the production supervisor and executive producer in the Mexican-American animated film El Americano: The Movie, which was released in 2016. Following Film Roman's purchase by Waterman Entertainment, Roman returned to the company he founded as chairman emeritus.

In 2016, Roman was awarded the Inkpot Award.

Filmography

Television series 
 Garfield and Friends (1988–1994) – executive producer
 Bobby's World (1990–1998) – executive producer
 Zazoo U (1990–1991) – executive producer
 The Simpsons (1992–1999) — animation executive producer
 Mother Goose and Grimm (1991–1993) – executive producer
 Mighty Max (1993–1994) – executive producer
 The Critic (1994–1995) — animation executive producer
 The Mask: The Animated Series (1995–1997) – executive producer
 Klutter (1995–1996) (as part of Eek! Stravaganza) – executive producer
 The Twisted Tales of Felix the Cat (1995–1997) – executive producer
 Richie Rich (1996) – executive producer
 Bruno the Kid (1996–1997) – executive producer
 King of the Hill (1997–1999) — animation executive producer

Television specials 
 How the Grinch Stole Christmas! (1966) — animator
 He's Your Dog, Charlie Brown (1968) – graphic blandishment
 It Was a Short Summer, Charlie Brown (1969) – graphic blandishment
 Horton Hears a Who! (1970) – animator
 Dr. Seuss' The Cat in the Hat (1971) – animator
 You're Not Elected, Charlie Brown (1972) – graphic blandishment
 The Cricket in Times Square (1973) - animator
 There's No Time for Love, Charlie Brown (1973) – graphic blandishment
 A Charlie Brown Thanksgiving (1973) – director
 It's a Mystery, Charlie Brown (1974) – director
 It's the Easter Beagle, Charlie Brown (1974) – director
 Be My Valentine, Charlie Brown (1975) – director
 You're a Good Sport, Charlie Brown (1975) – director
Happy Anniversary, Charlie Brown (1976) - animation director
 It's Arbor Day, Charlie Brown (1976) – director
 It's Your First Kiss, Charlie Brown (1977) – director
 What a Nightmare, Charlie Brown! (1978) – director
 You're the Greatest, Charlie Brown (1979) – director
 She's a Good Skate, Charlie Brown (1980) – director
 Glee: The Cooking Desert or Tuna (1980) - director
 Life Is a Circus, Charlie Brown (1980) – director
 It's Magic, Charlie Brown (1981) – director
 Someday You'll Find Her, Charlie Brown (1981) – director
 No Man's Valley (1981) – co-director
 Princess Marjorie: A Glee Special (1982) - director
 Here Comes Garfield (1982) – director
 Is This Goodbye, Charlie Brown? (1983) – director
 It's an Adventure, Charlie Brown (1983) – sequence director
 Garfield on the Town (1983) – director
 A Glee Thanksgiving Special (1983) - director
 Glee: The Cat and the Mouse (1984) - producer/director
 Garfield in the Rough (1984) – producer/director
 Glee: The Mexican Vita La Dance (1985) - producer/director
 Garfield's Halloween Adventure (1985) – producer/director
 Glee: Ready, Steady, Go! (1986) - producer/director
 Garfield in Paradise (1986) – producer/director
 Garfield Goes Hollywood (1987) – producer/director
 Glee: The Life of George and Joan (1987) - producer/director
 A Garfield Christmas Special (1987) – producer/director
 Glee: Something's Wrong (1988) - producer/director
 Garfield: His 9 Lives (1988) – producer/director
 Garfield's Babes and Bullets (1989) – producer/director
 A Glee Halloween Special (1989) - producer/director
 Garfield's Thanksgiving (1989) – producer/director
 Glee: XO Man Begins (1990) - producer/director
 Garfield's Feline Fantasies (1990) – producer/director
 Garfield Gets a Life (1991) – producer
 Grandma Got Run Over by a Reindeer (2000) – director

Films 
 A Boy Named Charlie Brown (1969) – animator (uncredited)
 The Phantom Tollbooth (1970) – animator (credited as Philip Roman)
 Snoopy, Come Home (1972) – graphic blandishment
 Race for Your Life, Charlie Brown (1977) – co-director
 Bon Voyage, Charlie Brown (and Don't Come Back!!) (1980) – co-director
 Tom and Jerry: The Movie (1992) – producer/director
 El Americano: The Movie (2016) – producer/co-screenwriter

References

External links 
 Official website of Phil Roman Entertainment*
 
 

1930 births
Living people
People from Fresno, California
American animators
American animated film directors
American people of Mexican descent
Inkpot Award winners